Driss Trichard (born 27 March 1995) is a French professional footballer who plays as a midfielder for  club Dunkerque.

Career
Trichard made his professional debut for Toulouse on 8 March 2014 in a 3–2 home win over Stade de Reims.

On 17 August 2021, Trichard signed a two-year contract with Dunkerque.

Personal life
Born in France, Trichard is of Algerian descent.

References

External links
 
 
 
 

Living people
1995 births
Association football midfielders
French footballers
France youth international footballers
French sportspeople of Moroccan descent
Ligue 1 players
Ligue 2 players
Championnat National 2 players
Championnat National 3 players
Toulouse FC players
FC Girondins de Bordeaux players
Clermont Foot players
USL Dunkerque players
People from Aubervilliers
Footballers from Seine-Saint-Denis